Jerome Paul Stano (September 30, 1932 – August 29, 2011) is a former member of the Ohio Senate. Originally appointed to succeed Ron Mottl who had been elected to Congress in 1974, Stano won a full term in 1976.  However, in an upset in 1980, Stano lost to Republican Gary C. Suhadolnik, in a Republican wave that saw Democrats lose control of the upper chamber. Suhadolnik went on to serve in the Senate for over eighteen years.

References

1932 births
Democratic Party Ohio state senators
2011 deaths